Climate Refugees is a 2010 American documentary film, directed and produced by Michael P. Nash. The documentary attempts to cover the human impact of climate change by considering those who could most be affected by it.

Content
With contributions from several politicians, scientists, and environmental activists, including House Speaker John Kerry, Newt Gingrich, Al Gore, Nobel Prize winner Wangari Maathai, the film documents the human plight of climate change with a focus on the intersection of over population, lack of resources and climatic change. Filmmaker Michael Nash and producing partner Justin Hogan traveled to 48 countries in search of the human face of climate change.

The film attempts to illuminate the national security implications of countries running out of food and water due to vast droughts and climatic shifts.

Interviewees

 Lester Brown
 Wangari Maathai
 Yvo de Boer
 Dr. Paul R. Ehrlich
 Newt Gingrich
 John Kerry
 Bert Metz
 Barack Obama
 Nancy Pelosi
 Gov. Bill Ritter
 Ken Salazar
 Stephen Schneider
 Achim Steiner
 Desmond Tutu	
 Al Gore (archive footage)

Release 
Its world premiere was 29 January 2010 at the 2010 Sundance Film Festival and it was released on August 17, 2011. The film had a small theatrical release, and distributed by Netflix, iTunes and Amazon. It was particularly marketed through screening events, having been screened at the Senate and House, The Pentagon, The Vatican, and foundations including the United Nations COP15 climate summit in December 2009 in Copenhagen. Many screenings and discussion events for the film were held at universities.

Reception
Robert Redford described it in The New York Times as "a resounding wake-up call for every human being." The documentary went on to play in over 100 festivals around the world winning multiple awards.

References

External links
 
 

2010 films
American documentary films
2010 documentary films
Documentary films about refugees
Documentary films about environmental issues
Barack Obama
Desmond Tutu
Al Gore
2010s English-language films
2010s American films